Henrik Norlén (born 2 September 1970) is a Swedish actor.

Selected filmography

Film

Television

References

External links
 

1970 births
Living people
Swedish male film actors
People from Karlstad